The British Rail Class 40 is a type of British railway diesel electric locomotive. A total of 200 were built by English Electric between 1958 and 1962. They were numbered D200-D399. They were, for a time, the pride of British Rail's early diesel fleet. However, despite their initial success, by the time the last examples were entering service they were already being replaced on some top-level duties by more powerful locomotives. As they were slowly relegated from express passenger uses, the type found work on secondary passenger and freight services where they worked for many years. The final locomotives ended regular service in 1985.  The locomotives were commonly known as "Whistlers" because of the distinctive noise made by their turbochargers.

Origins

The origins of the Class 40 fleet lay in the prototype diesel locomotives (LMS No. 10000 and 10001 ordered by the London, Midland and Scottish Railway and British Railways and D16/2 ordered by British Railways between 1947 and 1954) and most notably with the Southern Region locomotive No. 10203, which was powered by English Electric's 16SVT MkII engine developing 2,000 bhp (1,460 kW). The bogie design and power train of 10203 was used almost unchanged on the first ten production Class 40s.

Prototypes

British Railways originally ordered ten Class 40s, then known as "English Electric Type 4s", as evaluation prototypes. They were built at the Vulcan Foundry in Newton-le-Willows, Lancashire. The first locomotive, D200, was delivered to Stratford on 14 March 1958. Five of the prototypes, Nos. D200, D202-D205, were trialled on similar services on the former Great Eastern routes, whilst the remaining five, Nos. D201, D206-D209, worked on Great Northern services on the East Coast Main Line.

Sir Brian Robertson, then chairman of the British Transport Commission, was less than impressed, believing that the locomotives lacked the power to maintain heavy trains at high speed and were too expensive to run in multiple – opinions that were later proved to be correct. Airing his views at the regional boards prompted others to break cover and it was agreed that later orders would be uprated to 2,500 hp (a change that was never applied). Direct comparisons on the Great Eastern Main Line showed they offered little advantage over the "Britannia" class steam locomotives when driven well, and the Eastern Region declined to accept further machines as they deemed them unsuitable to replace the Pacific steam locomotives on the East Coast Main Line, preferring to hold on until the "Deltic" Class 55 diesels were delivered.

The London Midland Region was only too pleased, as the Eastern Region's decision released additional locomotives to replace their ageing steam fleet. The West Coast Main Line had been starved of investment for many years and the poor track and generally lower speeds (when compared to the East Coast route) suited Class 40s, as the need to hold trains at speed for long periods simply did not exist and it better took advantage of their fairly rapid acceleration.

Production

Following the mixed success of the prototypes, another 190 locomotives were ordered by British Railways, and were numbered from D210 to D399. All were built at Vulcan Foundry, except one batch of twenty (Nos. D305–D324) which were built at Robert Stephenson and Hawthorns factory in Darlington. All the locomotives were painted in the British Railways diesel green livery, and the final locomotive, D399, was delivered in September 1962.

Batches of the class were built with significant design differences, due to changes in railway working practices. The first 125 locomotives, Nos. D200–D324, were built with steam-age 'disc' headcode markers, which were used to identify services. Later, it was decided that locomotives should display the four character train reporting number (or headcode) of the service they were hauling, and Nos. D325–D344 were built with 'split' headcode boxes, which displayed two characters either side of the locomotive's central gangway doors. Another policy decision led to the discontinuing of the gangway doors (which enabled train crew to move between two or three locomotives in multiple). The remaining locomotives, Nos. D345–D399, carried a central four-character headcode box. In 1965, seven of the first batch of locomotives, Nos. D260–D266, which were based in Scotland, were converted to the central headcode design.

From 1973, locomotives were renumbered to suit the TOPS computer operating system, and became known as 'Class 40'. Locomotives D201 to D399 were renumbered in sequence into the range 40 001 to 40 199. The first built locomotive, D200, was renumbered 40 122, which was vacant due to the scrapping of D322 as the result of accident damage.

The named 40s

Locomotives in the range D210–D235 were to be named after ships operated by the companies Cunard Line, Elder Dempster Lines, and Canadian Pacific Steamships, as they hauled express trains to Liverpool, the home port of these companies. The only locomotive not to carry a name was D226 which was to carry the name Media but never did so. From approximately 1970, with Class 40s no longer working these trains, the nameplates were gradually removed, so that by 1973 contributors to Railway World were reporting 7 different locomotives running without nameplates, all observed in North Wales. However the Ian Allan Motive Power Combined Volume (a list of all operational locomotives published annually for enthusiasts) was still listing the names of all officially named Class 40 locomotives in 1980 despite none having carried their nameplates for many years.

A series of unofficial names were applied to the Class 40s by enthusiasts and enthusiastic depot staff. Some locos ran in service with these names applied for many months, others were painted out within days.

The locos to carry these unofficial names were:
 40 060 'Ancient Mariner' (while in departmental duties as 97 405)
 40 104 'Warrior'
 40 129 'Dracula'
 40 131 'Spartan'
 40 132 'Hurricane'
 40 134 'Andromeda'
 40 137 'Trojan'
 40 145 'Panther'
 40 150 'Crewe'
 40 155 'Vulcan Empress'
 40 164 'Lismore'

BR service 

The Class 40s operated in all areas of British Railways although sightings in the Western and Southern Regions have always been exceptionally rare and usually the result of special trains and/or unusual operational circumstances, but examples have been recorded such as D317 hauling a parcels train between Micheldever and Basingstoke on 3 July 1967, and D335 operating the 07:35 Oxford to Paddington and 10:16 Paddington - Birmingham on 29 June 1971. A review of the areas of operation published towards the end of the class's operational life showed no regular operational service on the Southern Region, and the only parts of the Western Region regularly visited were the Cambrian Line between Shrewsbury and Aberystwyth, and freights on the Gloucester to Severn Tunnel Junction route.

After the early trials the majority of Class 40s were based at depots in northern England, notably Longsight, Carlisle Kingmoor, and Wigan Springs Branch on the Midland Region, and Thornaby and Gateshead on the Eastern Region.

The heyday of the class was in the early 1960s, when they hauled top-link expresses on the West Coast Main Line and in East Anglia. However, the arrival of more powerful diesels such as Class 47, Class 50, Class 55, and the later InterCity 125, together with the electrification of the West Coast Main Line, meant that the fleet was gradually relegated to more mundane duties.

In later life the locomotives were mainly to be found hauling heavy freight and passenger trains in the north of England and Scotland.  As more new rolling stock was introduced, their passenger work decreased, partly due to their lack of electric train heating (D255 was fitted with electric train heating for a trial period in the mid-1960s) for newer passenger coaches. They lost their last front-line passenger duties – in Scotland – in 1980, and the last regular use on passenger trains was on the North Wales Coast Line between Holyhead, Crewe and Manchester, along with regular forays across the Pennines on Liverpool to York and Newcastle services.

Throughout the early 1980s Class 40s were common performers on relief, day excursion (adex) and holidaymaker services along with deputisation duties for electric traction, especially on Sundays between Manchester and Birmingham. This resulted in visits to many distant parts of the network. It would be fair to say that few routes in the London Midland and Eastern regions did not see a Class 40 worked passenger service from time to time. Regular destinations included the seaside resorts of Scarborough, Skegness and Cleethorpes on the Eastern region, with Blackpool and Stranraer being regularly visited on the West Coast.

Much rarer workings include visits to London's Paddington and Euston stations, Norwich, Cardiff and even Kyle of Lochalsh. The fact that 40s could turn up almost anywhere resulted in them being followed by a hard core of bashers, enthusiasts dedicated to journeying over lines with rare traction for the route.

Withdrawal 

Withdrawal of the Class 40s started in 1976, when three locomotives (40 005, 40 039 and 40 102) were taken out of service. At over 130 tons the Class were by then considered underpowered. In addition, some were found to be suffering from fractures of the plate-frame bogies (due mainly to inappropriate use on wagon-load freight and the associated running into tightly curved yards), and spares were also needed to keep other locomotives running.

Also, many Class 40s were not fitted with air braking, leaving them unable to haul more modern freight and passenger vehicles. Despite this, only seventeen had been withdrawn by the start of the 1980s. The locomotives became more popular with railway enthusiasts as their numbers started to dwindle.

Withdrawals then picked up apace, with the locomotives which lacked air brakes taking the brunt of the decline. In 1981, all 130 remaining locomotives were concentrated in the London Midland region of BR. Classified works overhauls on the Class 40s were also gradually phased out, only 29 members of the class had a full classified in 1980, and the final two emerged from Crewe Works in 1981. The last to receive a classified overhaul was 40 167 in February 1981.

After that, numbers dwindled slowly until, by the end of 1984, there were only sixteen still running. These included the pioneer locomotive, 40 122, which, having been withdrawn in 1981, was reinstated in July 1983 and painted in the original green livery to haul rail enthusiasts' specials. The last passenger run by a Class 40, apart from 40 122, occurred on 27 January 1985, when 40 012 hauled a train from Birmingham New Street to York. All the remaining locomotives except 40 122 were withdrawn the next day.

The majority of Class 40s were cut up at Crewe, Doncaster, and Swindon works.
Crewe works dismantled the most 40s, the totals are listed below.
 Crewe Works scrapped 65 locos
 Doncaster Works scrapped 64 locos
 Swindon Works scrapped 54 locos.

The other ten locos to be scrapped were cut at Derby, Glasgow, Inverkeithing, and Vic Berry at Leicester.

1981 and 1983 saw the highest number of Class 40 withdrawals, a total of 41 locomotives being withdrawn both years.

The very last Class 40s to be cut up were 40 091 and 40 195 by A. Hampton contractors at Crewe Works in December 1988.

Further use

The Class 40 story was not quite over, however. Upon the joint initiative of enthusiasts Howard Johnston and Murray Brown who noticed  40 122 on the withdrawn sidings at Carlisle Kingmoor depot in summer 1981 ready to go to Swindon Works for breaking up. 40 122 was reinstated by BR and overhauled at Toton depot with parts from 40 076. Now in working condition and repainted in BR green, it was regularly used to haul normal passenger trains in the hope of attracting enthusiasts, as well as special trains. In addition, four locomotives were temporarily returned to service as Class 97 departmental locomotives, numbered 97 405–408. They were used to work engineering trains for a remodelling project at Crewe station. These were withdrawn by March 1987.

40 122 was eventually withdrawn in 1988 and presented to the National Railway Museum. Six other locomotives were preserved, and on 30 November 2002, over sixteen years after the last Class 40 had hauled a mainline passenger train, the Class 40 Preservation Society's 40 145 hauled an enthusiasts' railtour, "The Christmas Cracker IV", from Crewe to Holyhead via Birmingham. Following a three-year hiatus, after suffering a traction motor flashover, 40 145 returned to mainline operation in 2014.

Accidents and incidents
 On 3 June 1962, D244, just 30 months old was at the head of the 22:15 Kings Cross - Edinburgh sleeper from the previous night. The train was diverted from Peterborough via Sleaford with a route conductor taking charge. Approaching Lincoln at 00:45 hours on the Sunday morning, too fast for a 15 mph permanent speed restriction, the locomotive lurched but stayed on the track, though its train of sleeping cars were all derailed. The rear portion of the train narrowly missed demolishing Pelham Street Signal Box. Three people were killed in the incident, including the Sleeping Car Attendant whilst 30 others were injured.
 On 26 December 1962, D215 Aquitania was hauling the up Mid-Day Scot when it collided with the rear of a Liverpool-Birmingham train, at Coppenhall Junction, Crewe. 18 were killed and 34 injured, including the guard. Contrary to popular belief, D326 was not hauling the train.
 On 13 May 1966, a freight train became divided between Norton Junction and Weaver Junction, Cheshire. Locomotive D322, hauling an express passenger train, was in collision with the rear part of the freight train, which had run away. Both the driver and secondman were killed. The locomotive was withdrawn in September 1967.
 On 7 May 1965, a freight train was derailed at Preston-le-Skerne, County Durham. Locomotive No. D350 was hauling a newspaper train that ran into the derailed wagons and was itself derailed. Recovery of the locomotive was not until 16 May.
 On 14 August 1966, locomotive No. D311 was hauling a passenger train which was derailed when it ran into a landslip at Sanquhar, Dumfriesshire.
 On 6 August 1975, locomotive No. 40 189 was hauling a freight train which was unable to stop due to a lack of brake power. It collided with another freight train at Weaver Junction, Cheshire.
 On 26 October 1975, an express passenger train failed at Lunan, Angus. One person was killed and eleven were injured.
 On 24 December 1977, 40 164 was in collision with coaches (due to form the 06:00 service to Mallaig) in platform 5 of Glasgow Queen Street Station.  The driver had lost control of the locomotive on the 1 in 45 descending gradient in Queen Street Tunnel.  The cause of the accident was identified at the subsequent inquiry to packing pieces not having been inserted into the brake system after the locomotive's wheels had been profiled on the wheel lathe, reducing their diameter.
 In September 1978, locomotive No. 40 044 was hauling a freight train that ran away and was derailed by trap points at Chinley, Derbyshire.

D326: The Great Train Robbery, 1963
D326 (later 40 126) was the most famous Class 40, but for unfortunate reasons. The engine had an early chequered history.  It was classed as a jinxed loco by some railwaymen, with some drivers being reluctant to drive it. In 1963 it was involved in the infamous "Great Train Robbery", and a year later in August 1964 a secondman was electrocuted when washing the windows. Finally, in August 1965, it suffered total brake failure with a maintenance train at Birmingham New Street and hit the rear of a freight train, injuring the guard. It then settled down and had a normal life until it was scrapped in 1984.

40126 was withdrawn from service on 15 February 1984. Upon withdrawal the locomotive was offered to the National Railway Museum at York as an exhibit loco regarding its past history.  However, the NRM declined and it was scrapped at Doncaster Works with indecent haste, no doubt to stop any pillaging souvenir hunters. Other famous "40s" include 40 106, which was the last one to remain in BR green livery, and 40 009, the last 40 to still have vacuum brakes only.

In popular culture
40118 appeared in the opening scenes of the film Robbery, a fictionalised version of the Great Train Robbery.

Preservation
Seven locomotives and one cab end (40 088) have been preserved on heritage railways, including the first built, D200, and the departmental locomotives: 97406, 97407 and 97408. Not all locomotives may be carrying their names currently and these are noted in the chart below.

Of the seven class 40s to be preserved, all except for 40118 have run in preservation and three have run on the main line in preservation; these are D200 (40122), D213 (40013) and D345 (40145). As of 2018, D213 and D345 are operational on the main line.

One locomotive, 40013 Andania, was rescued from Vic Berry's scrapyard in 1987. D212 Aureol was briefly sent to Vic Berry's scrapyard for asbestos removal, before being moved to its new home at the Midland Railway Centre.

Model railways
There have been quite a few models of Class 40s over the years. In OO gauge, French manufacturer Jouef entered the UK OO gauge market with a Class 40 model in about 1977. This was available in blue or green, but only the disc headcode version was available; it was not a very accurate model, being overly wide. Next, Lima produced a much better Class 40 from 1988 and was available with all four types of nose styles. Bachmann produced a super-detailed Class 40 in the early 2000s, but this was criticised somewhat for poor shape in the cab area. This was addressed by Bachmann later in production, when lighting was included and the drive was a true 1CO-CO1 arrangement.

In 2010 Hornby Railways launched its first version of the BR Class 40 which was a remotored Lima model that Hornby had acquired, which is basic representation of the prototype as part of their Railroad range in BR Blue in OO gauge.

N gauge models of the Class 40 have been produced by Graham Farish, representing the main three headcode versions. A BR Green version of D211 Mauretania received a positive review from The Railway Magazine Guide to Modelling in 2017.

Notes

References

Further reading

External links
 The Class 40 Appreciation Society    Photo gallery with over 9,000 Class 40 images, topics, and discussions.
 Class 40 motherlist Just about everything you need to know about the Class 40s

Locomotive details
 Detailed photoguides (annotated):
 , including driver's desk, secondman's position, AWS equipment
 , including sanding gear, hand brake, vacuum brake controls
 , including bogie structure; brake, heating and electrical connections
 , camshaft and associated components

Preservation groups

 Class 40 Preservation Society, operators of 40 145 on the mainline and 40 106 & 40 135 on the East Lancashire Railway.
 The Class 40 Appeal, owners of 40 012 (and 37 109).

40
1Co-Co1 locomotives
English Electric locomotives
Vulcan Foundry locomotives
Robert Stephenson and Hawthorns locomotives
Railway locomotives introduced in 1958
Standard gauge locomotives of Great Britain
Diesel-electric locomotives of Great Britain